Alim Kaisynovich Kouliev (born June 24, 1959) is a Soviet-born American actor, theatre director, and screenwriter of Balkar origin. Kouliev was born in Nalchik — a small city in USSR. His father was the Balkar poet Kaisyn Kuliev and his mother was his Ingush wife Maka. His older brother Eldar Kuliev was a Russian film director and a screenwriter. His younger brother Azamat Kuliev is a Russian painter, living and working in Istanbul, Turkey. At the age of seven, Kouliev was influenced by Vladimir Visotsky, an acclaimed Russian actor, poet, and singer, and one of his father's younger colleagues in the poetry field. Alim later decided to become an actor.

Biography 

He studied acting at the Russian Academy of Theatre Arts (GITIS) in Moscow. After serving in the Soviet Army, he was studying stage directing in GITIS, and continued his education at the All-Union State Institute of Cinematography (VGIK) in Moscow, where he graduated from the acting class of Yevgeny Matveyev, an acclaimed master of theater and cinema. His classmate was Natalya Vavilova.

Ever since he was a student, Kouliev appeared on the professional stage. His first significant role on stage was Mercutio in Shakespeare's Romeo and Juliet at Aleksandr Demidov Theater-Studio, where he also played Atavio in The Moods of Marianne by Alfred de Musset and Meleander in Maurice Maeterlinck's Aglavain and Selyzett. He broke into films starring as Joseph Codrero in Copper Angel with Leonid Kuravlyov, Anatoly Kuznetsov, Aleksandr Filippenko, Leonid Yarmolnik. He has twelve years of acting experience working in leading Moscow theaters and has had several roles in the famous Russian feature films.  Kouliev created many great characters in classic and contemporary productions, under the best Russian theatrical directors.

In 1991, his life changed dramatically; he moved to the United States.

After a long break in his career as an actor, Kouliev made his comeback. In Los Angeles, he became a key member of the theatrical troupe Dreamhouse Ensemble, where he played Sasha Smirnoff in Room Service and Uncle Tobit in Jimmy Christ. In 2009, the producer-actor-director presented his "master project", his own stage adaptation of Mikhail Bulgakov’s novel The Master and Margarita. Alim Kouliev performs extensively as an actor in the Hollywood film industry, on stage, and on TV.

Filmography

Stage

Acting

Directing

References

External links

Alim Kouliev. The Master and Margarita Project
Alim Kouliev. Interview.
YouTube. Oleander. Episode 2
 Alim Kouliev. United States Copyrights Office. Kouliev Alim. Mansur. PAu003862115 / 2017-05-12
 Alim Kouliev. Interview. "Алим Кулиев об отце, Америке и противоборстве добра и зла" |
Киноактеры из России сыграют в голливудском театре 
Backstage. ROOM SERVICE 

1959 births
Living people
People from Nalchik
Soviet male film actors
Russian male film actors
Russian male stage actors
American male film actors
American male stage actors
American theatre directors
Russian Academy of Theatre Arts alumni
American male television actors
Gerasimov Institute of Cinematography alumni
Soviet emigrants to the United States